Iskender Pasha (1620) was an Ottoman commander and the beylerbey of Oczakov (Ozi). In 1620 Iskender Paşa led an Ottoman army, with Wallachian contingents (13,000-22,000) against the Polish–Lithuanian Commonwealth at the Battle of Cecora, where he was victorious. In 1613–1614 he was the beylerbey of the Bosnia Eyalet.

Notes

17th-century people from the Ottoman Empire
Pashas
Ottoman generals
Ottoman governors of Bosnia